Edwin William Walker (27 December 1909 – 16 March 1994) was an English cricketer. Walker was a right-handed batsman who bowled right-arm fast-medium. He was born at Coalville, Leicestershire.

Walker made a single first-class appearance for Leicestershire against Worcestershire in the 1930 County Championship at New Road, Worcester. Worcestershire batted first and made 222 all out, with Walker taking the wicket of Leslie Wright to finish the innings with figures of 1/21 from seventeen overs. Leicestershire were dismissed for just 58 in their response, with Walker dismissed for a single run by Reg Perks. Forced to follow-on in their second-innings, Leicestershire were dismissed for 152, with Walker ending the innings not out on 1. Leicestershire lost the match by an innings and 12 runs, while Walker never played for the county again.

He died at Gravesend, Kent on 16 March 1994.

References

External links
Edwin Walker at ESPNcricinfo
Edwin Walker at CricketArchive

1909 births
1994 deaths
People from Coalville
Cricketers from Leicestershire
English cricketers
Leicestershire cricketers